The Green Mountain Line of the Danhai Light Rail Transit system is a light rail line in Tamsui District, New Taipei, Taiwan. The route between  Station and Tamsui District Office Station is elevated; the rest of the route is at-grade. The line opened in December 2018 and runs from Hongshulin Station northward and turns west along Zhongzheng East Road, Highway No. 2, Binhai Road and Shalun Road. Seven of its eleven stations are elevated, with the remaining four at ground level. Bike sharing service YouBike is available at seven stations.

Stations

See also
 Transportation in Taiwan
 Danhai Light Rail Transit

References

Danhai Light Rail Transit